Yusuf Erdoğan (born 7 August 1992) is a Turkish footballer who plays as a winger for Adana Demirspor. He can also play as a left back.

Career
Erdoğan made his Süper Lig debut on 18 August 2013 against Beşiktaş in 2-0 away loss. He was known as Turkish Messi

On 16 January 2023, Erdoğan signed a 2.5-year contract with Adana Demirspor.

International career
In August 2013 he was called up to Turkey U21 in the Euro qualifying. He made his debut against Poland U-21. On 30 August 2015, Erdoğan was selected for the senior Turkey squad for UEFA Euro 2016 qualifiers against Latvia and Netherlands.

Honours
Trabzonspor
 Süper Lig: 2021–22
 Turkish Super Cup: 2022

References

External links
 
 
 

1992 births
Living people
People from Isparta
Turkish footballers
Turkey under-21 international footballers
Association football midfielders
1461 Trabzon footballers
Trabzonspor footballers
Bursaspor footballers
Kasımpaşa S.K. footballers
Adana Demirspor footballers
Süper Lig players
TFF First League players
TFF Second League players